The 2023 Le Mans Cup, known as the 2023 Michelin Le Mans Cup under sponsorship, will be the eighth season of the Le Mans Cup. The six-event season will begin at Circuit de Barcelona-Catalunya on 22 April and will finish at Algarve International Circuit on 22 October. The series is open to Le Mans Prototypes in the LMP3 class, and grand tourer sports cars in the GT3 class.

Calendar
The provisional calendar for the 2023 season was announced on 22 September 2022.

Entries

LMP3
All cars in the LMP3 class used the 2020 spec Nissan VK56DE 5.6L V8 engine and Michelin tyres. The new-for-2022 race length of 1h 50m removes the need for the additional mandatory stop that was introduced in 2020 to mitigate unexpected higher fuel consumption.

GT3

Notes

References

External links
 

Le Mans Cup
Le Mans Cup
Le Mans Cup